Seminole County Courthouse may refer to:

Seminole County Courthouse (Georgia), Donalsonville, Georgia
Seminole County Courthouse (Oklahoma), Wewoka, Oklahoma